Euippe  or Evippe  (Ancient Greek: Εὐίππη; English translation: "good mare") is the name of eight women in Greek mythology:
 Euippe, a daughter of Danaus and the naiad Polyxo. She married (and murdered) Imbrus, son of Aegyptus and Caliadne.
 Euippe, another daughter of Danaus, this time by an Ethiopian woman. She married either Argius, son of Aegyptus and a Phoenician woman, or Agenor, son of Aegyptus.
 Euippe, another name for Hippe, daughter of Chiron.
 Euippe of Paionia, the mother, by Pierus, of the Pierides, nine sisters who challenged the Muses and, on their defeat, were turned into magpies.
 Euippe (daughter of Tyrimmas). She bore Odysseus a son, Euryalus, who was later mistakenly slain by his father.
 Euippe, daughter of Leucon. She bore Andreus a son, Eteocles, king of Orchomenus (not to be confused with Eteocles, son of Oedipus).
 Euippe, daughter of Daunus, the king of a people in Italy. She was loved by Alaenus, half-brother of Diomedes.
 Euippe, mother of Meriones by Molus. Hyginus referred to her by a different name, which survives in a corrupt form, *Melphis.

Notes

References 

 Apollodorus, The Library with an English Translation by Sir James George Frazer, F.B.A., F.R.S. in 2 Volumes, Cambridge, MA, Harvard University Press; London, William Heinemann Ltd. 1921. ISBN 0-674-99135-4. Online version at the Perseus Digital Library. Greek text available from the same website.
 Gaius Julius Hyginus, Fabulae from The Myths of Hyginus translated and edited by Mary Grant. University of Kansas Publications in Humanistic Studies. Online version at the Topos Text Project.
 Parthenius, Love Romances translated by Sir Stephen Gaselee (1882-1943), S. Loeb Classical Library Volume 69. Cambridge, MA. Harvard University Press. 1916.  Online version at the Topos Text Project.
 Parthenius, Erotici Scriptores Graeci, Vol. 1. Rudolf Hercher. in aedibus B. G. Teubneri. Leipzig. 1858. Greek text available at the Perseus Digital Library.
 Pausanias, Description of Greece with an English Translation by W.H.S. Jones, Litt.D., and H.A. Ormerod, M.A., in 4 Volumes. Cambridge, MA, Harvard University Press; London, William Heinemann Ltd. 1918. . Online version at the Perseus Digital Library
 Pausanias, Graeciae Descriptio. 3 vols. Leipzig, Teubner. 1903.  Greek text available at the Perseus Digital Library.
 Publius Ovidius Naso, Metamorphoses translated by Brookes More (1859-1942). Boston, Cornhill Publishing Co. 1922. Online version at the Perseus Digital Library.
 Publius Ovidius Naso, Metamorphoses. Hugo Magnus. Gotha (Germany). Friedr. Andr. Perthes. 1892. Latin text available at the Perseus Digital Library.'

Danaids
Family of Athamas
Princesses in Greek mythology
Boeotian characters in Greek mythology
Cretan characters in Greek mythology